Royal Wootton Bassett Academy (RWBA) (formerly Wootton Bassett School) is a mixed secondary school and sixth form in the town of Royal Wootton Bassett, Wiltshire, England, for students aged 11 to 18. In July 2011, the school became an academy.

Facilities 
The facilities include an AstroTurf sports pitch and numerous sports facilities catering for tennis, cricket, football, rugby and hockey.

The sixth form centre has classrooms and a lecture theatre with retractable chairs, also used as a drama studio.

Administrative structure 
Adopted in the early 2000s, the school employed a system of phases. There were three main categories, the 'Transition', 'Development' and 'Extension' phases, all of which were presided over by an Assistant Headteacher. This system has since been abolished, after proving unpopular with staff and drawing criticism as "corporate jargon". The school since returned to the traditional method of grouping students into Lower School, Upper School and Sixth Form.

The school operates a system of tutor groups, each tutor having approximately 30 students. Tutors rarely teach students from their own group. The main role of groups is to create a stable peer system, with each aiming to tutor the same group throughout their 5 years. These tutor groups change if students leave to sixth form.

The layout of the school is like two 'E's back to back, and a main corridor running down the middle, nicknamed 'The Street' by pupils and teachers alike. Each branch teaches a group of subjects, such as Humanities, Arts and Modern Foreign Languages. All the 'wings' have 2 floors, that, excluding Modern Foreign Languages, Humanities and Arts, have different subjects on either floor. The Modern Foreign Languages wing used to be the shortest, under half the length of the others, until the sixth form centre was added.

The house system 
RWBA's house system encapsulates the holistic approach the Academy takes to the development of its students and staff. There are five houses, co-ordinated by five heads of house, each named after the four "Bassetts": Winterbourne, Compton, Wootton, Berwick and Bassett. They compete in a year-long series of competitions that generally revolve around attaining as many points as possible. The school places a focus on charity, with harvest festival food collection and non-uniform days, where money will be collected and given to various charities. The house system promotes a strong family sense of identity with the house, and with the Academy, and is widely valued by students and staff alike.

References

External links 

Secondary schools in Wiltshire
Academies in Wiltshire
Royal Wootton Bassett